Eckhard Märzke, also spelled Eckart Märzke (born 7 December 1952 in Greifswald) is a former East German football player and currently manager of FC Pommern Greifswald in the Verbandsliga Mecklenburg-Vorpommern (VI).

Märzke made 153 DDR-Oberliga appearances for F.C. Hansa Rostock and BSG Stahl Brandenberg, as well as a further four for the latter during the 1986–87 UEFA Cup campaign.

References

1952 births
Living people
People from Greifswald
East German footballers
Association football defenders
FC Hansa Rostock players
German football managers
Footballers from Mecklenburg-Western Pomerania